The Prussian G 4.3 was a class of 0-6-0 goods locomotive of the Prussian State Railways; they were manufactured between 1903 and 1907 by Union Giesserei in Königsberg. The type was developed with the aim of improving the running characteristics of 6-coupled locomotives. However, they were quickly outclassed by increasing weight of freight trains. 

They were used for passenger and ordinary freight services, as well as express freight trains, mainly in the eastern divisions. Only 63 locomotives were manufactured, of which 39 were included in the 1923 DRG renumbering plan, as 53 296 and 297, and 53 301 to 53 337. In the final 1925 plan, the Reichsbahn renumbered the remaining 28 locomotives as 53 301 to 53 328. They were all retired by 1928.

After World War I, ten locomotives were transferred to Poland, and five to the Free City of Danzig. The PKP operated all 15 as class Th4. Nine locomotives were transferred to Belgium; they were not renumbered, and all were retired in 1923.

During World War II, three of the Danzig locomotives were taken back into the Reichsbahn fleet as 53 7751 to 53 7753. They passed to Deutsche Bundesbahn at the end of the war; one was sold to a sugar factory in 1946, but all were retired in 1951.

The locomotives were coupled to type pr 3 T 10.5 or pr 3 T 12 tenders.

Notes

References

Further reading

0-6-0 locomotives
G 04.3
Railway locomotives introduced in 1903
Standard gauge locomotives of Germany
C n2v locomotives
Union Giesserei locomotives
Freight locomotives